Otay Reservoir may refer to:

 Upper Otay Reservoir
 Lower Otay Reservoir